Urrbrae may refer to:
Urrbrae, South Australia, a suburb of Adelaide
Urrbrae Agricultural High School, actually in the neighbouring suburb of Netherby, South Australia
Urrbrae House, given by Peter Waite to the University of Adelaide